The name Marie has been used for fourteen tropical cyclones in the eastern and western Pacific Ocean tropical cyclone basins.

In the Eastern Pacific:
 Hurricane Marie (1984), a Category 1 hurricane that stayed offshore Baja California in early September
 Hurricane Marie (1990), a Category 4 hurricane that had no effects on land; briefly threatened the Hawaiian islands
 Hurricane Marie (2008), a Category 1 hurricane that had no effects on land
 Hurricane Marie (2014), a rare Category 5 hurricane that produced some flooding in coastal Mexico while producing large swells that caused damage and multiple deaths along Baja California and Southern California
 Hurricane Marie (2020), a Category 4 hurricane that had no effects on land

In the Western Pacific:
 Typhoon Marie (1954) (T5415), a relatively weak typhoon which nonetheless devastated Japan and killed 1,361 people; also sank the Tōya Maru, hence becoming known as the Toyamaru Typhoon
 Typhoon Marie (1958) (T5827), a strong typhoon that had no effects on land
 Tropical Storm Marie (1961) (T6117, 49W), made landfall in Shikoku as a tropical depression
 Typhoon Marie (1964) (T6416, 20W, Undang), an erratic system which meandered in the Ryukyu Islands
 Typhoon Marie (1966) (T6631, 33W), another strong typhoon that stayed at sea
 Tropical Storm Marie (1969) (T6919, 23W), the final storm of the 1969 season; did not affect land areas
 Typhoon Marie (1972) (T7224, 26W), which destroyed many crops and coconut palms in the Northern Mariana Islands
 Typhoon Marie (1976) (T7603, 03W, Konsing), a strong early-season typhoon which did not affect land
 Typhoon Marie (1997) (T9705, 06W), a typhoon which formed in the Northern Mariana Islands but ultimately did not impact any major landmass

See also 
 Tropical Storm Mary (1962)

Pacific hurricane set index articles
Pacific typhoon set index articles
Australian region cyclone set index articles